Hamza Ali Khaled Al-Dardour (born 12 May 1991) is a Jordanian professional footballer who plays as a forward for Jordanian club Al-Ramtha and the Jordan national team.

Club career
In 2015, Al-Dardour joined Saudi club Al Faisaly. He then played for Kuwait SC and Al-Ramtha in 2016, before joining Al-Wehdat in 2017. In 2020, Al-Dardour returned to Al-Ramtha.

International career
Hamza's first match with the Jordan national team was against Uzbekistan on 2 January 2011, in a friendly which resulted in a 2–2 draw, coming on as a substitute for Hassan Abdel-Fattah.

In the 2015 AFC Asian Cup, Hamza scored four goals against Palestine in a 5–1 win in their second group stage match. It was the only super hat-trick of the tournament, and a writer for The Guardian reported: "It was a pure goal poacher's performance, with three of the strikes coming from tap-ins after perfectly timed runs into the box".

Career statistics

International

Source:

International goals
Scorea and results shows Jordan's goal tally first

Honours

Al-Ramtha
Jordan Premier League: 2021
Jordan Super Cup: 2022

Kuwait
Kuwait Emir Cup: 2015–16

Al-Wehdat
Jordan Premier League: 2017–18
Jordan Shield Cup: 2017
Jordan Super Cup: 2018

References

External links
 
 
 Hamza Al-Dardour at foxsports.com

1991 births
Living people
People from Irbid Governorate
Jordanian footballers
Association football forwards
Al-Ramtha SC players
Shabab Al-Ordon Club players
Najran SC players
Khaleej FC players
Al-Faisaly FC players
Kuwait SC players
Al-Wehdat SC players
Jordanian Pro League players
Saudi Professional League players
Kuwait Premier League players
Jordan youth international footballers
Jordan international footballers
2011 AFC Asian Cup players
2015 AFC Asian Cup players
Jordanian expatriate footballers
Jordanian expatriate sportspeople in Saudi Arabia
Jordanian expatriate sportspeople in Kuwait
Expatriate footballers in Saudi Arabia
Expatriate footballers in Kuwait
FIFA Century Club